Paolo Mandelli (born 4 December 1967 in Milan) is an Italian former association football manager and player of the Italian club Sassuolo.

Club career
Originally from the Inter youth system, Mandelli played only one senior game with the Nerazzurri; after a season on loan at Lazio, he then spent the rest of his career with minor teams such as Sambenedettese, Messina, Reggiana, Monza, Foggia and Modena. He retired in 2003 after two seasons with Sassuolo.

Coaching career
After his retirement, Mandelli agreed to stay at Sassuolo as youth coach and head of the under-19 team. In 2011, he was appointed as temporary head coach on a caretaker basis, in place of sacked Angelo Gregucci, to guide the relegation-threatened club until the end of the season and keep it into Serie B. The attempt turned out to be successful, as Mandelli led Sassuolo in 15th place, and out of the relegation playoffs. He then returned to his previous duties by the end of the season and was replaced by new head coach Fulvio Pea.

External links

1967 births
Living people
Italian footballers
Italy youth international footballers
Serie A players
Serie B players
Inter Milan players
S.S. Lazio players
A.S. Sambenedettese players
A.C.R. Messina players
A.C. Reggiana 1919 players
Calcio Foggia 1920 players
A.C. Monza players
Modena F.C. players
U.S. Sassuolo Calcio players
U.S. Sassuolo Calcio managers
Association football forwards
Italian football managers